The Dominican singer, songwriter and producer Juan Luis Guerra has released 14 studio albums, two live albums and forty-eight singles. He is one of the best selling Latin artist of all time with more 30 millions of records worldwide. He made his debut with his first studio album Soplando, released in 1984. He later released his second studio album in 1985, Mundanza y Acarreo which was his first national success and marked his first entry at the US Billboard Charts at number seventeen on Billboard Tropical Charts. In 1987, his third studio album Mientras Más Lo Pienso...Tú  become his first work to gain international attention in countries such as Venezuela and Puerto Rico. Between this last two albums, it sold over two million copies worldwide.

Juan Luis Guerra's fourth studio album, Ojala Que Llueva Cafe receive universal acclaim by the critics and is considered by many his most important work. The album sold over 2.5 millions of copies worldwide established himself as a superstar throughout Latin America and Europe. It peaked at the Top 10 in Spain, Puerto Rico and Argentina and also at the top 10 of US Cashbox charts and Billboard Tropical Charts. In 1990, His follow album up, Bachata Rosa is Guerra most successful album, helping the lunch Bachata and Merengue to mainstrean and international audience. It remained at the number one for 24 weeks on US Billboard Tropical Charts and was the best selling tropical album of 1991 and breaking record sales and top the charts Mexico, Spain, Chile, Argentina, Portugal, Holland and Belgium. Four of the singles released became top-ten hits on the Billboard Hot Latin Songs chart. It was certified platinum (Latin field) in the United States by the Recording Industry Association of America (RIAA), Gold in Brazil, 7 times Platinum in Spain and Gold in Netherlands. Eventually, it sold more than 5 millions of copies worldwide and is one of the Best Selling Latin Albums of All Time.

He later released he sixth studio album Areito in 1992, which containd his first number one single on Billboard Hot Latin Songs El Costo de la vida, receive limited commercial success in comparation of his last record. However, it sold over two million copies worldwide, peaked at the number two in Spain and the top 10 of US Billboard Tropical and Latin Albums Charts. In the same way it was certified Gold in Argentina, Colombia and Mexico and Platinum in Spain and Venezuela. His next album Fogarate (1994) debuted at the top 20 Portugal and Netherlands and Top 10 in US Billboard Charts and Chile and Puerto Rico. Sales, however, were significantly less than the two previous studio albums. Juan Luis Guerra y 4:40 released a greatest hits album titled Grandes Éxitos Juan Luis Guerra y 440 in 1995, which was certified three time platinum in Spain.

After a hiatus of more than three years due personal issues, Ni es lo mismo ni es igual, Guerra's eight studio album, was released in 1998 sold over one million of copies and peaked number four on the Top Latin Albums and number two on the Tropical Albums chart and received a doble-patlinum certification (Latin Field) by RIAA for selling over 400,000 copies. In 2001, he released Coleccion Romantic which contains re-recorded versions of his earlier hits. It sold 50,000 copies in it first week in Spain and was platinum certification (Latin Field) by RIAA for selling over 100,000 copies. In 2004, he released Para Ti, his first Christian album and hist ninth album overall. It debuted number 110 on Billboard 200 and topped the Billboard Latin charts and was certified three times platinum certification (Latin Field) by RIAA for selling over 300,000 copies.

In 2007, Juan Luis Guerra released the 10th studio La Llave De Mi Corazon which become his first album to debut at number one on Billboard Latin Albums charts and was a success in Latin America where it was certified gold and platinum. His next album, Asondeguerra (2010), debuted at the top of Spanish and Uruguay charts and was certified gold by AMPROFON for selling 30,000 copies in Mexico and platinum by RIAA for selling over 100,000 copies. He later released his second Christian album Coleccion Cristiana in 2012 and his first live album A Son de Guerra Tour debuted and peaked at number 80 on the Billboard 200 and number one of Billboard Latin Albums. It was certified gold by AMPROFON for selling 30,000 copies in Mexico. In the same way was certified gold in Ecuador and Colombia.

Todo tiene su Hora was released by Capitol Latin in 2014 and debuted at number 65 on the U.S. Billboard 200 and at number one on the Billboard Top Latin Albums chart, selling 6,000 copies in its first week. It was received a Latin album gold certification by the Recording Industry Association of America (RIAA) for shipping 30,000 copies and gold by PROMUSICAE for selling 20,000 units in Spain. His 14th studio album, Literal, was released by Universal Music Latin in 2019. In 2020 he released his first EP Prive and his second live album, Entre Mar y Palmeras, the subsequent year.

Albums

Studio albums

EP albums

Live albums

Compilation albums

Singles

As lead artist

As guest artist

Collaborations

References 

Discographies of Dominican Republic artists
Tropical music discographies
Discographies